Glamis Gold Ltd. was a Reno, Nevada-based gold producer with operations in the Americas. In 2006 they expected to produce 620,000 ounces of gold at a total cash cost of US$190 per ounce. At that time, their assets remained 100% unhedged.

On 31 August 2006, Goldcorp (NYSE stock symbol GG) announced the acquisition of Glamis Gold (NYSE former symbol GLG) for US$8.6 billion, creating one of the world's largest gold mining companies with combined assets (in 2006) of US$21.3 billion . The takeover was completed in November 2006.

See also
 Gold as an investment
 Gold mining

References

External links
 Goldcorp, Inc.

Companies formerly listed on the New York Stock Exchange
Companies formerly listed on the Toronto Stock Exchange
Defunct mining companies of the United States